Hermanville is a census-designated place and unincorporated community in Claiborne County, in southwest Mississippi, United States.  Its ZIP code is 39086.

It was first named as a CDP in the 2020 Census which listed a population of 692.

History
Hermanville was established on March 15, 1886.  The town's economy was based on cotton, cattle, and timber products.

The Episcopal Church of the Epiphany was built in Hermanville in 1887.  By 1982, the congregation had become inactive as population decreased. In 1985 the building was moved to the Mississippi Agriculture and Forestry Museum in Jackson, where it is used as a chapel.

The Natchez, Jackson and Columbus Railroad was completed in 1882, and a depot was established in Hermanville.  Known locally as "The Little J", the line ran between the state capital of Jackson and Natchez. It had various owners; the last was the Illinois Central Railroad, which abandoned the line in railroad industry restructuring between 1979 and 1981.

During the early 1960s, a lumber mill in Hermanville was producing  of high-quality southern pine annually.

The Pink Palace in Hermanville was described in 2000 as "probably the most photogenic juke joint in Mississippi". The building was constructed of three side-by-side mobile homes with their common walls removed. The inside walls were painted in folk art.

Author Nevada Barr wrote of Hermanville in 2000:
The town, if such a humble scatter of buildings around a crossroads and a single-room post office could be called a town, embodied the Northerner's view of the "real" Mississippi.  The gracious homes of Natchez were not in evidence, nor was the classic architecture...seen in Port Gibson and the city of Clinton. Trailer houses and shacks sat at odd angles to the two-lane road as if they had fallen haphazardly from a passing cargo plane.

Demographics

2020 census

Note: the US Census treats Hispanic/Latino as an ethnic category. This table excludes Latinos from the racial categories and assigns them to a separate category. Hispanics/Latinos can be of any race.

Education
Hermanville is served by the Claiborne County School District. Port Gibson High School is the comprehensive high school of the district.

Notable people
 Maxwell Bodenheim, Jazz Age poet and novelist known as the "King of Greenwich Village Bohemians".

References

Further reading
 World of Decay Photographs and a description of Hermanville from 2010

Unincorporated communities in Claiborne County, Mississippi
Unincorporated communities in Mississippi
Census-designated places in Claiborne County, Mississippi